Julie Berry (born September 3, 1974) is an American author of children's and young adults books and winner of several national book awards.

Biography
Julie Gardner Berry grew up on a farm in rural Medina, New York as the youngest of seven children in a Mormon family. She received a B.S. in communications at Rensselaer Polytechnic Institute (RPI) in Troy, New York in 1995 and later earned an M.F.A. from Vermont College of Fine Arts in 2008. Berry met her husband, actor Phil Berry at RPI. They married in 1995. They have four sons together. The family lived for many years in Maynard, Massachusetts, west of Boston, before moving to Temple City, California. During the early years of her writing career Berry also worked as marketing director with the family business, a data collection software company. While living in Maynard, Berry was a columnist for the MetroWest Daily News.

Julie and her family moved back to Medina, New York in 2021. She purchased the independent bookstore, The Book Shoppe, which she renovated and renamed the Author's Note.

Awards and honors
Seven of Berry's books are Junior Library Guild selections: All the Truth That's In Me (2014), The Passion of Dolssa (2017), The Emperor’s Ostrich (2017), Lovely War (2019), and Wishes and Wellingtons (2020).

All the Truth That's in Me was named one of the best books of the year by The Horn Book, Kirkus Reviews, and School Library Journal.

The Scandalous Sisterhood of Prickwillow Place was named one of the best children's books of 2014 by the Wall Street Journal.

The Passion of Dolssa was a New York Times Notable Title.

Lovely War was a New York Times bestseller and was named one of the best books of 2019 by The Bulletin of the Center for Children's Books, The Horn Book, Kirkus Reviews, Publishers Weekly, School Library Journal, Shelf Awareness, and the Wall Street Journal. It was also a New York Times Notable Children’s Books of 2016.

Books
 The Amaranth Enchantment (2009)
 Secondhand Charm (2010)
 Splurch Academy for Disruptive Boys: The Rat Brain Fiasco (2010) with Sally Gardner
 Splurch Academy for Disruptive Boys: Curse of the Bizarro Beetle (2010) with Sally Gardner    
 Splurch Academy for Disruptive Boys: The Colossal Fossil Freakout (2011) with Sally Gardner
 Splurch Academy for Disruptive Boys: The Trouble with Squids (2011) with Sally Gardner
 All the Truth That’s In Me (2013) Viking/Penguin Group, New York, NY. 
 The Scandalous Sisterhood of Prickwillow Place (2014) Roaring Brook Press, New York, NY. 
 The Passion of Dolssa (2017) Penguin Books, New York, NY. 
 The Emperor’s Ostrich (2017) Roaring Brook Press, New York, NY. 
 Wishes and Wellingtons (2018) Audible Originals, LLC, an AMAZON company. (audiobook)
 Lovely War (2019) Viking Press, New York, NY. 
 Crime and Carpetbags (2021) Sourcebooks Young Readers. ISBN 978-1728231495
 Cranky Right Now (2021) Sounds True. ISBN 978-1683646648

References

External links
  
 
 Lexi Connor at LC Authorities (no catalog records) and at WorldCat
 

1974 births
Living people
21st-century American writers
American children's writers
Latter Day Saints from California
Latter Day Saints from Massachusetts
Latter Day Saints from New York (state)
People from Maynard, Massachusetts
Rensselaer Polytechnic Institute alumni
Vermont College of Fine Arts alumni
Writers from California
Writers from Massachusetts
People from Medina, New York